The 2018–19 Azadegan League was the 28th season of the Azadegan League and 18th as the second highest division since its establishment in 1991. The season featured 12 teams from the 2017–18 Azadegan League, two new teams relegated from the 2017–18 Persian Gulf Pro League: Siah Jamegan and Naft Tehran and two new teams promoted from the  2017–18 League 2: Karoon Arvand Khorramshahr and Shahin Bushehr both as champions. Navad Urmia replaced Gostaresh Foulad, while Sorkhpooshan Pakdasht replaced Esteghlal Jonoub. Oxin Alborz changed their name into Gol Reyhan. The league started on 10 August 2018 and ended on 30 April 2019. Gol Gohar won the Azadegan League title for the first time in their history. Gol Gohar and Shahin Bushehr promoted to the Persian Gulf Pro League.

Teams 
Before the start of competition Naft Tehran was relegated to League 2 following financial problems

Stadia and locations

Number of teams by region

Personnel and kits
Note: Flags indicate national team as has been defined under FIFA eligibility rules. Players may hold more than one non-FIFA nationality.

League table

Naft Tehran and Siah Jamegan refused to attend 2 matches and relegated to 2 lower divisions.

Results

Statistics

Top scorers

See also
 2018–19 Persian Gulf Pro League
 2018-19 League 2
 2018–19 League 3
 2018–19 Hazfi Cup
 2018 Iranian Super Cup

References

Azadegan League seasons
I